Ian Andrew Kirkpatrick  (born 24 May 1946) is a former New Zealand rugby union player. Described as "supremely athletic, fast, fearless and with an uncanny sense of anticipation", Kirkpatrick is widely regarded as one of the greatest flankers to have ever played the game. His try-scoring ability was astonishing; at the time Kirkpatrick played rugby, it was rare for forwards to score tries, but his 16 test tries were an All Black record until Stu Wilson surpassed it in 1983. He also captained the All Blacks and was inducted into the World Rugby Hall of Fame in 2014.

Career
One year later he moved to Christchurch and established himself in the Canterbury team. Later that year, he made his international debut for the All Blacks against France in Paris.

In the first test of the 1968 series in Australia in Sydney, a game equally remembered for Colin Meads' crude attempt to clear Wallaby scrumhalf Ken Catchpole from a ruck, resulting in a horrific injury to Catchpole, Kirkpatrick came on as a 22nd-minute replacement for the captain Brian Lochore, who had broken his thumb. He thus became the first All Black to be used as a substitute according to the new International Rugby Football Board regulations With his only warm-up being the run down the stairs from the reserve seats, Kirkpatrick scored a hat-trick of tries in a 27–11 victory. For the next nine years, he was one of the first names on the All Blacks team sheet, playing a then-record 38 consecutive tests for the All Blacks.

In 1971, he was a part of the President's Overseas XV that was chosen to play against England to celebrate the centenary of the Rugby Football Union, scoring two tries in the 28–11 win at Twickenham. Later in the 1971 Lions series, he would score one of his most famous tries, a 55-metre solo effort in the 22–12 victory in the Second Test in Christchurch.

Kirkpatrick was appointed All Black captain in 1972 and led the 1972-73 tour to Europe and North America, a tour memorable for the controversial expulsion of Keith Murdoch (which Kirkpatrick would call one of his biggest regrets) and the Barbarians' famous 23–11 victory at Cardiff Arms Park.

By the time he retired early in the 1979 season, Kirkpatrick had played a total of 289 first-class games and scored 115 tries. He is to date also the only man to have captained both islands: the South in 1969 in his last season with Canterbury and then the North (in 1972–73) when he had returned home to Poverty Bay. He also appeared in 33 Ranfurly Shield matches for Canterbury.

Later life
In the 1980 Queen's Birthday Honours, Kirkpatrick was appointed a Member of the Order of the British Empire, for services to rugby. In 2003, he was inducted into the International Rugby Hall of Fame.

From 2005 to 2010 Kirkpatrick served as a part-time mentor with the Hurricanes Super Rugby franchise. In May 2020 he was named New Zealand Rugby's patron after the death of Sir Brian Lochore in 2019. In an interview with the news website Stuff that same month, Kirkpatrick expressed his concerns for the physical wellbeing of modern rugby players.

References

External links

Profile at World Rugby - Hall of Fame
100 Greatest All Blacks: Ian Kirkpatrick video interview with Wynne Gray

 

1946 births
Living people
New Zealand international rugby union players
New Zealand rugby union players
Canterbury rugby union players
Rugby union flankers
World Rugby Hall of Fame inductees
People educated at King's College, Auckland
Rugby union players from Gisborne, New Zealand
Poverty Bay rugby union players
New Zealand Members of the Order of the British Empire